San Pedro Garza García (also known as San Pedro or Garza García) is a city-municipality of the Mexican state of Nuevo León and part of the Monterrey Metropolitan area. It is a contemporary commercial suburb of the larger metropolitan city of Monterrey between Puente de la Unidad and the Alfa Planetarium, including areas surrounding Calzada del Valle/Calzada San Pedro. In 2018 it was evaluated as having the best quality of life in México.
It has luxury shopping malls, large green areas, as well as important colleges and hospitals. 
Cerro de Chipinque and Chipinque Ecological Park  are notable aspects of the city. The city hosts the headquarters of  corporations such as ALFA, Cemex, Gamesa, Vitro, Pyosa, Softtek, and Cydsa.

Geography
It sits in a valley surrounded by mountains, most notably La Loma Larga and Sierra Madre Oriental.

Government
The  Municipal President (Mayor) of San Pedro is Miguel Treviño de Hoyos, an independent candidate.

San Pedro Garza Garcia was founded in 1596. The land was converted into a large plantation called "Los Nogales" which produced crops like corn, wheat, and beans.

During the 18th century, the plantation often went by the name of "San Pedro", in honor of Saint Peter.

The city was not elevated to the status of "Villa" (Village) until December 14, 1882, when it was given the name Garza García, in honor of the governor of Nuevo León, Genaro Garza García.

It was not until 1988 that the mayor at the time, Alejandro Chapa Salazar gave the city its current name, adding the reference to what it was called centuries before.

Education

Higher education
The city is home to the Catholic university, Universidad de Monterrey (UDEM), which offers bachelor's degree and master's degree programs. The Instituto Tecnológico de Estudios Superiores de Monterrey (ITESM) has two of its graduate schools in San Pedro. The Escuela de Graduados en Administración y Dirección de Empresas (EGADE), ITESM's Graduate School of Business, and the Escuela de Graduados en Administración y Política Pública (EGAP), the Graduate School of Politics and Public Administration. Both campuses are located in Valle Oriente. There are no public universities in San Pedro.

Elementary and secondary education
San Pedro has 40 public pre-schools, elementary schools, middle schools, and high schools. The city also has 39 private schools. However, whereas public schools only offer one type of education (e.g., only middle school, or only elementary school), private schools offer multiple types (mostly K-9th and K-12).  If counted individually by type of education provided, private schools function as 88 different schools, more than twice the number of public schools.

Some examples of notable private schools in San Pedro are Bachillerato Anáhuac Campus Monterrey, Centro de Educación y Cultura del Valle, S.C. (CECVAC), Colegio Inglés, Instituto Anglia, Instituto Brillamont, Instituto Irlandés, Instituto Mater, Instituto San Roberto, Liceo de Monterrey, and The American Institute of Monterrey.

Other education

The Asociacion Regiomontana de Lengua Japonesa A.C., a part-time Japanese school, is in Garza García.

Chipinque Ecological Park
On the slopes of Cerro de Chipinque, within the Cumbres de Monterrey national park, is the Chipinque Ecological Park, with 1,791 hectares, covering altitudes from 730 to 2,200 meters with representative flora and fauna. The annual average temperature is 21 °C.

The Chipinque Ecological Park aims to conserve biodiversity through integrated management that ensures the conservation of its natural resources, which in turn promotes respect and appreciation of the ecosystem and geography of the place.

On the 25th anniversary of the park, the Chipinque brand was redesigned, which revitalized the relationship that visitors have with the park.

Notable residents
 Maria L. de Hernández (1896–1986), Mexican-American rights activist, was born in San Pedro Garza García.
 José Antonio Fernández Carbajal, notable businessman
 Lorenzo Zambrano, businessman and philanthropist
Alejandro Junco de la Vega, journalist and founder of Reforma
 Mauricio Fernández Garza, politician and businessman
 Lázaro Garza Ayala was a military officer, lawyer, and politician who served as governor of Nuevo León. He is known for writing the phrase "Las armas nacionales se han cubierto de gloria" (The national arms have been covered in glory).
 Julio Galan was a Mexican contemporary artist from the 1980s.

Sister City
San Pedro Garza García has one sister city.:
 - Plano, Texas, US

References

External links
 San Pedro Municipal Website
 Nuevo León Enciclopedia de los Municipios de México

Populated places in Nuevo León
Monterrey metropolitan area
1882 establishments in Mexico
Edge cities in Mexico